The 2017–18 season was 17th season in the top Ukrainian football league for Zorya Luhansk. Zorya competed in Premier League, Ukrainian Cup and UEFA Europa League.

Players

Squad information

Transfers

In

Out

Pre-season and friendlies

Competitions

Overall

Premier League

League table

Results summary

Results by round

Matches

Ukrainian Cup

UEFA Europa League

Statistics

Appearances and goals

|-
! colspan=14 style=background:#dcdcdc; text-align:center| Goalkeepers

|-
! colspan=14 style=background:#dcdcdc; text-align:center| Defenders

|-
! colspan=14 style=background:#dcdcdc; text-align:center| Midfielders 

|-
! colspan=14 style=background:#dcdcdc; text-align:center| Forwards

|-
! colspan=14 style=background:#dcdcdc; text-align:center| Players transferred out during the season

Last updated: 20 May 2018

Goalscorers

Last updated: 20 May 2018

Clean sheets

Last updated: 20 May 2018

Disciplinary record

Last updated: 20 May 2018

References

External links
 Official website

Zorya Luhansk
FC Zorya Luhansk seasons
Zorya Luhansk